Aujla Dhak is a village in Phillaur tehsil of Jalandhar District of Punjab State, India. It is located 6.4 km away from Mukandpur, 14 km from Goraya, 39 km from Jalandhar, and 113 km from state capital Chandigarh. The village is administrated by a sarpanch who is an elected representative of village as per Panchayati raj (India). Home of the AUJLA family.

Education
The village has a co-ed primary school (Pri Aujla Dhak School) founded in 1955 which also school provide a mid-day meal as per the Indian Midday Meal Scheme.

Transport

Rail 
The nearest train station is situated 21 km away in Goraya and Phagwara Jn Railway Station is 23 km away from the village.

Air 
The nearest domestic airport is 53 km away in Ludhiana and the nearest international airport is 139 km away in Amritsar other nearest international airport is located in Chandigarh.

References 

Villages in Jalandhar district
Villages in Phillaur tehsil